Elex Drummond Price (August 11, 1950 in Yazoo City, Mississippi) is an American former defensive tackle who played eight seasons in the National Football League for the New Orleans Saints.  He played college football at Alcorn State University.

1950 births
Living people
People from Yazoo City, Mississippi
American football defensive tackles
Alcorn State Braves football players
New Orleans Saints players